Emeka Emerun  (born 11 November 1994) is a Nigerian football player who plays for FK Budućnost Dobanovci in the Serbian First League.

Club career
Born in Owerri, he begin playing football inspired by his mother, who was a football player.  He started playing in a local football academy.  When he was 16 he went to Denmark and played one tournament where he scored 5 goals in 6 games and thus earned attention from German giants FC Bayern Munich who brought him to their youth team.  He played with Bayern Munich Junior Team in the 2011–12 Under 19 Bundesliga. He started his senior career playing with FC Bayern Munich II in the 2011–12 season.  During the winter-break he moved to Tunisia and signed with CA Bizertin.  He played on loan at Espérance Sportive de Tunis in 2013.  He left Tunisia by the end of 2014 after having played in the Tunisian Ligue Professionnelle 1 with Bizertin and Olympique Béja.  He returned to Europe and signed with Serbian side FK Sloboda Užice in summer 2015.

Personal life
His mother, Teresa Emerun, was a professional footballer.  He has four brothers and four sisters, and the four brothers all play football as well.

References

1994 births
Living people
People from Owerri
Nigerian footballers
Nigerian expatriate footballers
FC Bayern Munich II players
Expatriate footballers in Germany
CA Bizertin players
Espérance Sportive de Tunis players
Olympique Béja players
Tunisian Ligue Professionnelle 1 players
Expatriate footballers in Tunisia
FK Sloboda Užice players
FK Radnički Pirot players
FK Budućnost Dobanovci players
Serbian First League players
Expatriate footballers in Serbia
Association football forwards
Sportspeople from Imo State